S. Krishnamurthy was an Indian politician who served as mayor of Madras from 1964 to 1965. Hailing from a Brahmin family, Krishnamurthy stood as an independent candidate against K. M. Subramaniam of the Indian National Congress and was elected to power with the support of the Dravida Munnetra Kazhagam (DMK).

References 

 

Mayors of Chennai
Place of birth missing
Place of death missing
Year of birth missing
Year of death missing